Burnham Pavilion is a multi-purpose arena in Stanford, California.  It was built in 1921–22 at a cost of $153,000 by Bakewell and Brown  and originally named the "Stanford Pavilion".

It was home to the Stanford University Cardinal basketball team prior to Maples Pavilion opening in 1968.  When it opened, it was the largest arena used exclusively for basketball. On March 10, 1953, the Pavilion hosted a first round NCAA Division I men's basketball tournament matchup between the University of Santa Clara and Hardin-Simmons University.

It was known for many years as the "Old Pavilion" but was renamed Burnham Pavilion in 1989 after Malin Burnham, a principal contributor to a renovation that increased capacity to 1,400. As of 2009 it houses the gymnastics teams, the wrestling team and the men's volleyball team.

References

External links
Arena information

Stanford Cardinal basketball
Stanford Cardinal gymnastics
Defunct college basketball venues in the United States
Basketball venues in California
Indoor arenas in California
Sports venues in the San Francisco Bay Area
Stanford University buildings and structures
Arthur Brown Jr. buildings
Sports venues in Santa Clara County, California
1922 establishments in California
Sports venues completed in 1922
Volleyball venues in California
College volleyball venues in the United States
College wrestling venues in the United States
Wrestling venues in California